Wayne Osborne may refer to:

Wayne Osborne (baseball) (1912–1987), American baseball player 
Wayne Osborne (footballer) (born 1977), English former professional footballer
Wayne Osborne (Biologist) (born 1964), Automotive Service Specialist,  Biologist, Educator.  Researcher for Turtle Survival Alliance- North American Freshwater Turtle Research Group